2001.2011 is an album by French singer Mylène Farmer. It was her second compilation, after Les Mots in 2001, and was released on 5 December 2011. It contains all the singles from her last three studio albums and two new songs. One of them was the lead single from 2001.2011, "Du temps", released digitally on 7 November.

Background
On 3 November 2011, an article in the French newspaper France Soir confirmed rumors about an upcoming best of by Farmer, said it would be released on 5 December and showed the cover. The next day, Polydor officially announced the best of, saying: "After the Bleu noir album, certified diamond, Mylène Farmer presents 2001.2011, a selection of her greatest hits during that period. This album follows her first best of Les Mots, sold over 1.5 million. It will also contain two new tracks including new single". On 10 November, the track listing was revealed on the Internet: composed of 17 tracks, it includes all of Farmer's previous singles from her last three studio albums, one live single and two new songs.

Unlike Farmer's previous albums, the cover does not display a photo, but an abstract painting representing half of the singer's face, semi hidden behind a lock of red hair, drawing that Thierry de Cabarrus of Suite101 site considers as being "enigmatic, even melancholy".

Commercial performance
In France, the album debuted at number three, selling 40,455 units. In Switzerland, it began at number 36, and it reached the 8 position in the French-speaking part of Switzerland (Romandie). In Belgium (Wallonia), the album entered at number ten on the chart edition of 17 December 2011.

Track listings

CD

Collector box

Charts

Weekly charts

Year-end charts

Certifications and sales

Formats
 CD digipack 2001.2011 (17 tracks)
 LP 2001.2011 (17 tracks)
 Collector box 3 CD Best of (47 tracks)

Release history

References

2011 greatest hits albums
Mylène Farmer compilation albums
Polydor Records compilation albums
French-language compilation albums
Albums produced by Laurent Boutonnat